Natla may refer to:
 natla (נַטְלָה), a cup used for ritual handwashing in Judaism, from the Greek word αντλίον (natla)
 Jacqueline Natla, a character in the Tomb Raider games